Giorgio Sobrero (12 July 1930 – 10 September 2017) was an Italian sprinter. He competed in the men's 200 metres at the 1952 Summer Olympics.

References

External links
  

1930 births
2017 deaths
Athletes (track and field) at the 1952 Summer Olympics
Italian male sprinters
Olympic athletes of Italy